Icelandic singer and songwriter Björk has recorded more than two hundred songs for ten studio albums, two soundtrack albums, a compilation album, six remix albums and three collaboration albums. She is the sole writer and producer of most of the songs included in her albums. She also sometimes plays instruments during her recording sessions. Moreover, she has provided credited and uncredited contributions on songs recorded by other artists, including background vocals, songwriting, remixing and production.

After enrolling at the Barnamúsíkskóli in Reykjavík, she started developing an interest in writing and performing. A live recording of her rendition of Tina Charles' 1976 song "I Love to Love", sung when she was 10 years old, led to the signing of a record deal with Fálkinn. Her first eponymous solo release (1977), nowadays considered juvenilia, consisted of cover songs. Nonetheless, the album included her first composition, "Jóhannes Kjarval". Thereafter, Björk ventured into music bands experiences, singing as the lead voice of groups like Tappi Tíkarrass, Kukl, the Elgar Sisters and, most notably, the Sugarcubes. While recording with the Sugarcubes, Björk appeared as a background vocalist for fellow artists like Megas, Current 93 and Bless, and some of her original music was included in local music compilations. In 1990 she released Gling-Gló alongside Tríó Guðmundar Ingólfssonar, a cover album of jazz standards.

In 1993, after departing from The Sugarcubes, Björk released her first solo album, Debut, which propelled her to international stardom. The album was followed by a series of critically acclaimed recordings, including Post (1995), Homogenic (1997), Vespertine (2001), Medúlla (2004), Volta (2007), Biophilia (2011), Vulnicura (2015), and Utopia (2017). All of her albums were released under One Little Independent Records. Björk has collaborated with a number of artists and songwriters throughout her career, including Nellee Hooper, Sjón, Mark Bell, Anohni and Arca.

Björk's recorded output also encompasses songs recorded for motion pictures. She has composed theme songs for The Young Americans (1993), Anton (1996), Being John Malkovich (1999), Með mann á bakinu (2004), Hot Chocolate (2005) and Moomins and the Comet Chase (2010). Most notably, she created the soundtrack for Dancer in the Dark (2000), directed by Lars von Trier, while also acting as the main protagonist in the film itself, a role which gained her the Best Actress Award at the 53rd Cannes Film Festival, whereas her song "I've Seen It All" received a nomination at the 73rd Academy Awards for Best Original Song. Björk reprised double duty as main actress and composer for Matthew Barney's Drawing Restraint 9, for which she recorded an eponymous soundtrack (2005). Her latest contribution for a film is recording background vocals for The Northman soundtrack, her fourth feature movie role.

During the course of her career, Björk's songs and compositions were nominated for several music awards. She has received five BRIT Awards, four MTV Video Music Awards, one Academy Award nomination, and fifteen Grammy Awards nominations. In 2010, the Royal Swedish Academy of Music awarded her with the prestigious Polar Music Prize, considered the equivalent of the "Nobel Prize of Music" in Sweden, praising "her deeply personal music and lyrics, her precise arrangements and her unique voice". In 2017, Björk released her first song book, titled 34 Scores for Piano, Organ, Harpsichord and Celeste, which features a selection of arrangements for songs belonging to her catalogue.

Songs

Other contributions

See also
 Björk discography
 Björk videography

Notes

References

External links 
 Björk's official website
 Björk songs at AllMusic
 Björk songwriting details at the American Society of Composers, Authors and Publishers (ASCAP)

 
Björk